

Hermann Niehoff (3 April 1897 – 5 November 1980) was a German general during World War II.  In 1944, he was  a liuetenant general and commander of Heersgebeit Sudfrankreich (Army Group Southern France) facing the US/French invasion of southern France (Operation Dragoon).Since 2 March 1945, he was the garrison commander of Fortress Breslau (Festung Breslau) during the Battle of Breslau, which he surrendered to the Soviet 6th Army on 6 May 1945.

Awards

 Iron Cross (1914) 2nd Class (5 August 1916) & 1st Class (12 June 1918)
 Clasp to the Iron Cross (1939) 2nd Class (26 June 1940) & 1st Class (7 July 1941)
 Honour Roll Clasp of the Army (29 September 1941)
 German Cross in Gold on 6 January 1942 as Oberstleutnant in Infanterie-Regiment 464
 Knight's Cross of the Iron Cross with Oak Leaves and Swords
 Knight's Cross on 15 June 1944 as Generalleutnant and commander of the 371. Infanterie-Division
 764th Oak Leaves on 5 March 1945 as Generalleutnant and commander of the 371. Infanterie-Division
Niehoff was nominated for Swords in 1945 as commander of Breslau. No evidence of the award can be found in the German Federal Archives. The Association of Knight's Cross Recipients (AKCR) only assumes that the Swords were awarded. According to Niehoff's testimony he was nominated by Gauleiter Karl Hanke.

References

Citations

Bibliography

 
 
 
 

1897 births
1980 deaths
German Army personnel of World War I
Prussian Army personnel
German Army generals of World War II
Generals of Infantry (Wehrmacht)
People from the Province of Hanover
Recipients of the Gold German Cross
Recipients of the Knight's Cross of the Iron Cross with Oak Leaves and Swords
Recipients of the clasp to the Iron Cross, 1st class
German prisoners of war in World War II held by the Soviet Union
20th-century Freikorps personnel
People from Emsland
Military personnel from Lower Saxony